Alexander Vladimir d'Arbeloff (December 21, 1927 – July 8, 2008) was the Georgian-American co-founder of Teradyne, a multibillion-dollar Boston, Massachusetts-based manufacturer of automatic test equipment (ATE).

Early life 
He was born to a Georgian noble Vladimir d'Arbeloff, from Kutaisi, and German-Russian Baroness Catherine T. (Tiepolt) d'Arbeloff.

Career 
After graduating in 1949 with an SB in management from the MIT Sloan School of Management, where he became a member of the Sigma Chi fraternity, he and fellow MIT alumnus Nick DeWolf founded and built Teradyne into one of the largest players in the global ATE market as integrated circuits became increasingly important to every aspect of modern technology.

Upon his retirement from Teradyne in 2000, he was succeeded by George Chamillard.

D'Arbeloff was later a director of Lotus Development Corporation and a director of the Whitehead Institute. He became a member of the MIT Corporation in 1989, and was Chairman of the Corporation from 1997 to 2003. He was a Trustee of Partners Health Care System, Massachusetts General Hospital, and the New England Conservatory. He was also a former chairman of the Massachusetts High Technology Council.

In 1993, d'Arbeloff and his wife, Brit d'Arbeloff, established the Alex and Brit d'Arbeloff Fund for Excellence in MIT Education.

In 1999, d'Arbeloff and his wife made a $100,000 donation to the ALS Therapy Development Foundation, which later grew to become the ALS Therapy Development Institute, the largest dedicated ALS lab in the world.

Death 
In 2008 Alex died of cancer.

Personal life 
His brother, Dimitri was a President of Millipore Corp.

References
d’Arbeloff named chairman of Whitehead 
MIT club bio
Contribution to ALS TDI

1927 births
2008 deaths
American electrical engineers
MIT Sloan School of Management alumni
Massachusetts General Hospital people
Nobility of Georgia (country)
American company founders
20th-century American engineers
American people of Russian descent
French people of Russian descent
Russian engineers